Eliyahu Berligne (born 1866, died 25 February 1959) was a founder of Tel Aviv, an important member of the Yishuv in Mandate Palestine and a signatory of the Israeli declaration of independence.

Biography
Born in what is today Belarus in 1866, Berligne was an activist in Hovevei Zion and attended the First Zionist Congress in 1897. An opponent of the British Uganda Program, he visited Ottoman Palestine in 1905, and immigrated two years later, settling in Jaffa. After arriving, he founded an olive oil and soap factory in the Haifa and Gush Dan area, with the principle of Hebrew Labour.

A founder of the Progressive Party, Berligne later joined the General Zionists and was a member of the Jewish National Council. He served as treasurer of the council between 1920 and 1948, as well as manager of Bank Hapoalim.

In 1948 he was amongst the 37 people to sign Israel's declaration of independence, although he was unable to attend the declaration ceremony due to illness.

References

External links
 The personal papers of Eliyahu Berligne are kept at the   Central Zionist Archives in Jerusalem. The notation of the record group is A308.

Jewish National Council members
Members of the Assembly of Representatives (Mandatory Palestine)
Signatories of the Israeli Declaration of Independence
Zionist activists
Hovevei Zion
Progressive Party (Israel) politicians
General Zionists politicians
People from Mogilev
Jews from the Russian Empire
Emigrants from the Russian Empire to the Ottoman Empire
Israeli Jews
Belarusian Jews
1866 births
1959 deaths
Jews in Mandatory Palestine
Jews in Ottoman Palestine
Burials at Trumpeldor Cemetery